Deh-e Qazi (also Romanized as Deh-e Qāẕī) is a village in Qohab-e Rastaq Rural District, Amirabad District, Damghan County, Semnan Province, Iran. At the 2006 census, its population was 13, in 5 families.

References 

Populated places in Damghan County